Arney is a small village in County Fermanagh, Northern Ireland. It lies to the southwest of Enniskillen, between the village of Bellanaleck and the Five Points crossroads. Arney takes its name from the Arney River that feeds Lough Erne. It had a population of 114 people (along with Skea) in the 2001 Census. It is situated within Fermanagh and Omagh district.

Transport
Ulsterbus route 192 from Swanlinbar to Enniskillen serves Arney twice a day Mondays to Saturdays, providing a commuter link to/from Enniskillen. Leydons Coaches route 930 (Cavan-Ballyconnell-Swanlinbar-Enniskillen) serves Five Points crossroads a few times a day.

There is a coach in each direction every two hours during the day as well as an overnight journey. Services operate daily including Sundays.

References 

 NI Neighbourhood Information System

Villages in County Fermanagh
Fermanagh and Omagh district